The 1988 NCAA Division III Men's Ice Hockey Tournament was the culmination of the 1987–88 season, the 5th such tournament in NCAA history. It concluded with Wisconsin-River Falls defeating Elmira in the championship series 3-0 in the deciding mini-game. All Quarterfinals matchups were held at home team venues, while all succeeding games were played in Elmira, New York.

Plattsburgh State's tournament performance was later vacated due to NCAA violations.

The NCAA stopped naming an all-tournament team beginning with this tournament. The all-tournament team would next be awarded in 2009. Additionally, the Tournament Most Outstanding Player was not awarded but it would be conferred the following season.

Qualifying teams
The following teams qualified for the tournament. There were no automatic bids, however, conference tournament champions were given preferential consideration. No formal seeding was used while quarter and semifinal matches were arranged so that the road teams would have the shortest possible travel distances. Because the semifinal series were played at home team venues the NCAA elected to select an equal amount of eastern and western teams.

Format
The tournament featured three rounds of play. Starting in 1988, each round of the tournament consisted of a two-game series with a 20-minute mini-game used to determine a winner.  Mini-game scores are in italics. Also, in 1988, the third-place game was discontinued. The teams were seeded according to geographic proximity in the quarterfinals so the visiting team would have the shortest feasible distance to travel.

Bracket

Note: * denotes overtime period(s)Note: Mini-games in italics

Record by conference

Plattsburgh State's record not included

References

External links
Division III Men's Ice Hockey Record Book

 
NCAA Division III ice hockey